Partial Portraits is a book of literary criticism by Henry James published in 1888. The book collected essays that James had written over the preceding decade, mostly on English and American writers. But the book also offered treatments of Alphonse Daudet, Guy de Maupassant and Ivan Turgenev. Perhaps the most important essay was The Art of Fiction, James' plea for the widest possible freedom in content and technique in narrative fiction.

Summary and themes

The Art of Fiction was a response to remarks by English critic Walter Besant, who wrote an article that literally attempted to lay down the "laws of fiction." For instance, Besant insisted that novelists should confine themselves to their own experience: "A young lady brought up in a quiet country village should avoid descriptions of garrison life." James argued that a sufficiently alert novelist could catch knowledge from everywhere and use it to good purpose: "The young lady living in a village has only to be a damsel upon whom nothing is lost to make it quite unfair (as it seems to me) to declare to her that she shall have nothing to say about the military. Greater miracles have been seen than that, imagination assisting, she should speak the truth about some of these gentlemen."

James continually argues for the fullest freedom in the novelist's choice of subject and method of treatment: "The only obligation to which in advance we may hold a novel, without incurring the accusation of being arbitrary, is that it be interesting." In particular, James is suspicious of restraining fiction with specific moral guidelines: "No good novel will ever proceed from a superficial mind; that seems to me an axiom which, for the artist in fiction, will cover all needful moral ground."

James followed his own advice in criticizing the various writers included in Partial Portraits. In his long, engrossing essay on Maupassant, for instance, he couldn't help noticing the Frenchman's propensity for what James called the "monkeys' cage" view of human existence. But that didn't stop James from approving wholeheartedly of Maupassant's vigour, precision and conciseness in describing life as he saw it.

Similarly, James found much to appreciate in the intellectual force of George Eliot, the stolid but comprehensive detail-work of Anthony Trollope, the unbounded imagination of Robert Louis Stevenson, and the genial common sense of Alphonse Daudet. All very different writers, but all speak with validity from their personal view on life. This wide range presages the "house of fiction" image James would include in the New York Edition preface to The Portrait of a Lady, where each novelist looks at life from a particular window of the house and thus composes a unique and personally characteristic account.

Table of contents

Critical evaluation
Although later critics have often disagreed with James' particular judgments of individual writers or works, almost all acknowledge that James helped to make narrative fiction discussable as one of the fine arts. Partial Portraits contains some of James' most memorable and comprehensive essays on his fellow writers, and with grace and style he took their works seriously as artistic efforts of the first importance.

A personal note is the essay on Constance Fenimore Woolson, a woman who played an important if still uncertain role in James' life. This is the only essay in Partial Portraits on a writer of minor significance, and it has provided grist to the mill of biographical speculation.

References
Henry James Literary Criticism - Essays on Literature, American Writers, English Writers edited by Leon Edel and Mark Wilson (New York: Library of America 1984) 
Henry James Literary Criticism - French Writers, Other European Writers, The Prefaces to the New York Edition edited by Leon Edel and Mark Wilson (New York: Library of America 1984)

External links
Original magazine publication of the essay The Life of George Eliot (1885)
Original magazine publication of the essay Daniel Deronda: A Conversation (1885)
Original magazine publication of the essay Anthony Trollope (1883)
Original magazine publication of the essay Robert Louis Stevenson (1888)
Original magazine publication of the essay Alphonse Daudet (1883)
Original magazine publication of the essay Ivan Turgénieff (1884)
Original magazine publication of the essay George du Maurier (1883)
Note on the text of Partial Portraits at the Library of America web site
 

1888 non-fiction books
Books by Henry James